The National Displacement and Refugee Agency (NDRA) is a Somaliland government agency established in 2017 by President Muse Bihi Abdi, it is responsible to protect and assist refugees, asylum seekers, migrants and as well as returnees from abroad.
The Manager who serves as the head of the NDRA, is appointed by the President. The current Manager is Abdikarim Ahmed Mohamed.

See also
Somaliland Quality Control Commission
Politics of Somaliland
State Printing Agency

References

Government agencies of Somaliland
Government agencies established in 2017
2017 establishments in Somaliland